Ellen Brodkey (born Ellen Schwamm, 1934) is an American novelist. She is the author of Adjacent Lives (1979), and How He Saved Her (1985). She was married to the American writer Harold Brodkey.

References

1934 births
Living people
20th-century American novelists
American women novelists
20th-century American women writers
21st-century American women